Las Lajas is a settlement in Cuba near Guantánamo Bay. It is located in the southern part of the municipality of Guantánamo, immediately west of Mariana Grajales Airport, previously known as "Los Caños" aerodrome.

See also
Paraguay (village)
Arroyo Hondo
List of cities in Cuba

References

Populated places in Guantánamo Province
Guantánamo